The 2016–17 Charlotte Hornets season was the 27th season of the franchise in the National Basketball Association (NBA) and the fourth season under head coach Steve Clifford.

Off season
The Hornets team store at the Spectrum Center was damaged and looted by rioters during the 2016 Charlotte riot.

NBA draft

Roster

Game log

Pre-season

|- style="background:#fbb;"
| 1
| October 3
| @ Dallas
| 
| Frank Kaminsky III (13)
| Roy Hibbert (8)
| Hawes, Sessions (4)
| American Airlines Center 19,219
| 0–1
|- style="background:#fbb;"
| 2
| October 6
| Boston
| 
| Jeremy Lamb (16)
| Jeremy Lamb (10)
| Spencer Hawes (6)
| Greensboro Coliseum8,021
| 0–2
|- style="background:#fbb;"
| 3
| October 8
| @ Boston
| 
| Christian Wood (13)
| Frank Kaminsky III (12)
| Spencer Hawes (5)
| Mohegan Sun Arena8,052
| 0–3
|- style="background:#bfb;"
| 4
| October 10
| Minnesota
| 
| Frank Kaminsky III (17)
| Spencer Hawes (11)
| Nicolas Batum (5)
| Spectrum Center8,424
| 1–3
|- style="background:#bfb;"
| 5
| October 17
| @ Chicago
| 
| Belinelli, Kaminsky III (14)
| Michael Kidd-Gilchrist (10)
| Ramon Sessions (5)
| United Center20,025
| 2–3
|- style="background:#bfb;"
| 6
| October 20
| Miami
| 
| Kemba Walker (17)
| Michael Kidd-Gilchrist (14)
| Kemba Walker (6)
| Spectrum Center9,127
| 3–3
|- style="background:#fbb;"
| 7
| October 21
| @  Minnesota
| 
| Marco Belinelli (10)
| Jeremy Lamb (9)
| Walker, Wood (2)
| Target Center9,708
| 3–4

Regular season

|- style="background:#cfc
| 1
| October 26
| @ Milwaukee
| 
| Michael Kidd-Gilchrist (23)
| Michael Kidd-Gilchrist (14)
| Kemba Walker (8)
| BMO Harris Bradley Center18,717
| 1–0
|-style="background:#cfc
| 2
| October 28
| @ Miami
| 
| Kemba Walker (24)
| Marvin Williams (11)
| Walker, Batum, Sessions (4)
| American Airlines Arena19,600
| 2–0
|-style="background:#fcc
| 3
| October 29
| Boston
| 
| Kemba Walker (29)
| Cody Zeller (9)
| Nicolas Batum (6)
| Spectrum Center18,708
| 2–1
|-style="background:

|-style="background:#cfc
| 4
| November 2
| Philadelphia
| 
| Kemba Walker (22)
| Michael Kidd-Gilchrist (13)
| Kemba Walker (7)
| Spectrum Center15,275
| 3–1
|-style="background:#cfc
| 5
| November 4
| @ Brooklyn
| 
| Kemba Walker (30)
| Michael Kidd-Gilchrist (10)
| Cody Zeller (6)
| Barclays Center15,775
| 4–1
|-style="background:#cfc
| 6
| November 7
| Indiana
| 
| Kemba Walker (24)
| Spencer Hawes (13)
| Kemba Walker (10)
| Spectrum Center16,880
| 5–1
|-style="background:#cfc
| 7
| November 9
| Utah
| 
| Kemba Walker (21)
| Michael Kidd-Gilchrist (9)
| Kemba Walker (6)
| Spectrum Center15,712
| 6–1
|-style="background:#fcc
| 8
| November 11
| Toronto
| 
| Kemba Walker (40)
| Batum, Walker (10)
| Batum, Walker (6)
| Spectrum Center18,107
| 6–2
|-style="background:#fcc
| 9
| November 13
| @ Cleveland
| 
| Kemba Walker (21)
| Michael Kidd-Gilchrist (10)
| Nicholas Batum (7)
| Quicken Loans Arena20,562
| 6–3
|-style="background:#cfc
| 10
| November 15
| @ Minnesota
| 
| Kemba Walker (30)
| Cody Zeller (9)
| Nicholas Batum (7)
| Target Center10,349
| 7-3
|-style="background:#cfc
| 11
| November 18
| Atlanta
| 
| Nicolas Batum (24)
| Marvin Williams (11)
| Kemba Walker (6)
| Spectrum Center17,989
| 8–3
|-style="background:#fcc
| 12
| November 19
| @ New Orleans
| 
| Kemba Walker (25)
| Michael Kidd-Gilchrist (13)
| Ramon Sessions (9)
| Smoothie King Center15,739
| 8–4
|-style="background:#fcc
| 13
| November 21
| Memphis
| 
| Frank Kaminsky (23)
| Michael Kidd-Gilchrist (10)
| Nicolas Batum (5)
| Spectrum Center14,181
| 8–5
|-style="background:#fcc
| 14
| November 23
| San Antonio
| 
| Kemba Walker (26)
| Kemba Walker (9)
| Kemba Walker (7)
| Spectrum Center18,515
| 8–6
|-style="background:#fcc
| 15
| November 25
| @ New York
| 
| Marco Belinelli (19)
| Batum, Kaminsky (9)
| Nicolas Batum (8)
| Madison Square Garden19,812
| 8–7
|-style="background:#cfc
| 16
| November 26
| New York
| 
| Kemba Walker (28)
| Jeremy Lamb (17)
| Kaminsky, Sessions, Walker (3)
| Spectrum Center19,195
| 9–7
|-style="background:#cfc
| 17
| November 28
| @ Memphis
| 
| Lamb, Walker (21)
| Jeremy Lamb (9)
| Spencer Hawes (6)
| FedEx Forum13,143
| 10–7
|-style="background:#fcc
| 18
| November 29
| Detroit
| 
| Kemba Walker (23)
| Nicolas Batum (11)
| Nicolas Batum (5)
| Spectrum Center14,266
| 10–8

|-style="background:#cfc
| 19
| December 1
| Dallas
| 
| Kemba Walker (18)
| Nicolas Batum (9)
| Nicolas Batum (6)
| Spectrum Center14,471
| 11–8
|-style="background:#fcc
| 20
| December 3
| Minnesota
| 
| Kemba Walker (22)
| Kaminsky, Zeller (9)
| Nicolas Batum (12)
| Spectrum Center16,982
| 11–9
|-style="background:#cfc
| 21
| December 5
| @ Dallas
| 
| Kemba Walker (19)
| Nicolas Batum (15)
| Nicolas Batum (7)
| American Airlines Center19,228
| 12–9
|-style="background:#cfc
| 22
| December 7
| Detroit
| 
| Kemba Walker (25)
| Nicolas Batum (15)
| Kemba Walker (4)
| Spectrum Center15,141
| 13–9
|-style="background:#cfc
| 23
| December 9
| Orlando
| 
| Batum, Kidd-Gilchrist (16)
| Kaminsky, Batum (9)
| Nicolas Batum (7)
| Spectrum Center15,707
| 14–9
|-style="background:#fcc
| 24
| December 10
| @ Cleveland
|  
| Kemba Walker (24)
| Cody Zeller (9)
| Kaminsky, Walker (5)
| Quicken Loans Arena20,562
| 14–10
|-style="background:#fcc
| 25
| December 12
| @ Indiana
| 
| Marco Belinelli (14)
| Kidd-Gilchrist, Batum (10)
| Kemba Walker (5)
| Bankers Life Fieldhouse14,138
| 14–11
|-style="background:#fcc
| 26
| December 14
| @ Washington
| 
| Nicolas Batum (20)
| Hibbert, Walker (5)
| Kemba Walker (9)
| Verizon Center13,447
| 14–12
|-style="background:#fcc
| 27
| December 16
| @ Boston
| 
| Nicolas Batum (22)
| Zeller, Batum (10)
| Ramon Sessions (6)
| TD Garden18,624
| 14–13
|-style="background:#cfc
| 28
| December 17
| @ Atlanta
| 
| Marvin Williams (19)
| Cody Zeller (11)
| Kemba Walker (10)
| Philips Arena17,918
| 15-13
|-style="background:#cfc
| 29
| December 20
| L.A Lakers
| 
| Kemba Walker (18)
| Michael Kidd-Gilchrist (11)
| Batum, Walker (10)
| Spectrum Center19,093
| 16–13
|-style="background:#cfc
| 30
| December 23
| Chicago
| 
| Batum, Walker (20)
| Nicolas Batum (11)
| Nicolas Batum (10)
| Spectrum Center19,249
| 17–13
|-style="background:#fcc
| 31
| December 26
| @ Brooklyn
| 
| Nicolas Batum (24)
| Michael Kidd-Gilchrist (10)
| Kemba Walker (6)
| Barclays Center17,732
| 17–14
|-style="background:#cfc
| 32
| December 28
| @ Orlando
| 
| Kemba Walker (21)
| Nicolas Batum (9)
| Nicolas Batum (8)
| Amway Center18,273
| 18–14
|-style="background:#cfc
| 33
| December 29
| Miami
| 
| Kemba Walker (22)
| Nicolas Batum (13)
| Nicolas Batum (8)
| Spectrum Center19,471
| 19–14
|-style="background:#fcc
| 34
| December 31
| Cleveland
| 
| Kemba Walker (37)
| Michael Kidd-Gilchrist (8)
| Nicolas Batum (8)
| Spectrum Center19,519
| 19–15

|-style="background:#fcc
| 35
| January 2
| @ Chicago
| 
| Kemba Walker (34)
| Kemba Walker (11)
| Nicolas Batum (5)
| United Center21,612
| 19–16
|-style="background:#cfc
| 36
| January 4
| Oklahoma City
| 
| Nicolas Batum (28)
| Michael Kidd-Gilchrist (11)
| Kemba Walker (9)
| Spectrum Center18,418
| 20–16
|-style="background:#fcc
| 37
| January 5
| @ Detroit
| 
| Kemba Walker (32)
| Michael Kidd-Gilchrist (13)
| Batum, Walker (5)
| Palace of Auburn Hills13,723
| 20–17
|-style="background:#fcc
| 38
| January 7
| @ San Antonio
| 
| Kemba Walker (18)
| Kidd-Gilchrist, Zeller (9)
| Walker, Lamb (3)
| AT&T Center18,418
| 20–18
|-style="background:#fcc
| 39
| January 10
| @ Houston
| 
| Kemba Walker (25)
| Marvin Williams (8)
| Kemba Walker (10)
| Toyota Center16,196
| 20–19
|-style="background:#fcc
| 40
| January 13
| @ Philadelphia
| 
| Nicolas Batum (19)
| Michael Kidd-Gilchrist (12)
| Michael Kidd-Gilchrist (4)
| Wells Fargo Center18,215
| 20–20
|-style="background:#fcc
| 41
| January 16
| @ Boston
| 
| Kemba Walker (24)
| Nicolas Batum (10)
| Nicolas Batum (10)
| TD Garden18,624
| 20–21
|-style="background:#cfc
| 42
| January 18
| Portland
| 
| Kemba Walker (23)
| Cody Zeller (10)
| Nicolas Batum (7)
| Spectrum Center15,451
| 21–21
|-style="background:#cfc
| 43
| January 20
| Toronto
| 
| Kemba Walker (32)
| Michael Kidd-Gilchrist (11)
| Kemba Walker (8)
| Spectrum Center18,378
| 22–21
|-style="background:#cfc
| 44
| January 21
| Brooklyn
| 
| Michael Kidd-Gilchrist (17)
| Michael Kidd-Gilchrist (14)
| Batum, Walker (6)
| Spectrum Center18,583
| 23–21
|-style="background:#fcc
| 45
| January 23
| Washington
| 
| Kemba Walker (21)
| Cody Zeller (9)
| Nicholas Batum (6)
| Spectrum Center15,285
| 23–22
|-style="background:#fcc
| 46
| January 25
| Golden State
| 
| Kemba Walker (26)
| Spencer Hawes (12)
| Batum, Walker (8)
| Spectrum Center19,077
| 23–23
|-style="background:#fcc
| 47
| January 27
| @ New York
| 
| Kemba Walker (31)
| Nicolas Batum (11)
| Nicolas Batum (9)
| Madison Square Garden19,812
| 23–24
|-style="background:#fcc
| 48
| January 28
| Sacramento
| 
| Kemba Walker (26)
| Nicolas Batum (7)
| Batum, Walker (7)
| Spectrum Center18,597
| 23–25
|-style="background:#fcc
| 49
| January 31
| @ Portland
| 
| Kemba Walker (22)
| Nicolas Batum (8)
| Nicolas Batum (6)
| Moda Center19,393
| 23–26

|-style="background:#fcc
| 50
| February 1
| @ Golden State
| 
| Frank Kaminsky (24)
| Michael Kidd-Gilchrist (9)
| Batum, Belinelli (7)
| Oracle Arena19,596
| 23–27
|-style="background:#fcc
| 51
| February 4
| @ Utah
| 
| Kemba Walker (18)
| Marvin Williams (12)
| Batum, Walker (6)
| Vivint Smart Home Arena19,911
| 23–28
|-style="background:#cfc
| 52
| February 7
| Brooklyn
| 
| Batum, Walker, Belinelli (17)
| Frank Kaminsky (11)
| Kaminsky, Walker (5)
| Spectrum Center15,322
| 24–28
|-style="background:#fcc
| 53
| February 9
| Houston
| 
| Nicolas Batum (15)
| Michael Kidd-Gilchrist (9)
| Nicolas Batum (10)
| Spectrum Center16,270
| 24–29
|-style="background:#fcc
| 54
| February 11
| L.A Clippers
| 
| Nicolas Batum (25)
| Frank Kaminsky (8)
| Nicolas Batum (8)
| Spectrum Center19,483
| 24–30
|-style="background:#fcc
| 55
| February 13
| Philadelphia
| 
| Kemba Walker (29)
| Frank Kaminsky (11)
| Belinelli, Batum (4)
| Spectrum Center15,775
| 24–31
|-style="background:#fcc
| 56
| February 15
| @ Toronto
| 
| Frank Kaminsky (27)
| Michael Kidd-Gilchrist (14)
| Kemba Walker (9)
| Air Canada Centre19,800
| 24–32
|- align="center"
|colspan="9" bgcolor="#bbcaff"|All-Star Break
|-style="background:#fcc
| 57
| February 23
| @ Detroit
| 
| Kemba Walker (34)
| Michael Kidd-Gilchrist (14)
| Kemba Walker (6)
| The Palace of Auburn Hills14,913
| 24–33
|-style="background:#cfc
| 58
| February 25
| @ Sacramento
| 
| Frank Kaminsky (25)
| Frank Kaminsky (13)
| Kemba Walker (6)
| Golden 1 Center17,608
| 25–33
|-style="background:#fcc
| 59
| February 26
| @ L.A Clippers
| 
| Kemba Walker (34)
| Nicolas Batum (8)
| Batum, Kaminsky (4)
| Staples Center19,060
| 25–34
|-style="background:#cfc
| 60
| February 28
| @ L.A Lakers
| 
| Kemba Walker (30)
| Frank Kaminsky (12)
| Kemba Walker (7)
| Staples Center18,997
| 26–34

|-style="background:#fcc
| 61
| March 2
| @ Phoenix
| 
| Kemba Walker (26)
| Kidd-Gilchrist, Zeller (8)
| Kemba Walker (8)
| Talking Stick Resort Arena16,572
| 26–35
|-style="background:#cfc
| 62
| March 4
| @ Denver
| 
| Kemba Walker (27)
| Marvin Williams (12)
| Nicolas Batum (8)
| Pepsi Center14,708
| 27–35
|-style="background:#cfc
| 63
| March 6
| Indiana
| 
| Kemba Walker (28)
| Michael Kidd-Gilchrist (13)
| Kemba Walker (7)
| Spectrum Center16,387
| 28–35
|-style="background:#fcc
| 64
| March 8
| @ Miami
| 
| Kemba Walker (33)
| Marvin Williams (12)
| Marvin Williams (3)
| American Airlines Arena19,600
| 28–36
|-style="background:#cfc
| 65
| March 10
| Orlando
| 
| Kemba Walker (23)
| Marvin Williams (18)
| Nicolas Batum (10)
| Spectrum Center17,444
| 29–36
|-style="background:#fcc
| 66
| March 11
| New Orleans
| 
| Batum, Walker (24)
| Marvin Williams (10)
| Kemba Walker (12)
| Spectrum Center18,196
| 29–37
|-style="background:#fcc
| 67
| March 13
| Chicago
| 
| Jeremy Lamb (26)
| Marvin Williams (18)
| Kemba Walker (10)
| Spectrum Center16,489
| 29–38
|-style="background:#fcc
| 68
| March 15
| @ Indiana
| 
| Frank Kaminsky (20)
| Jeremy Lamb (7)
| Kemba Walker (4)
| Bankers Life Fieldhouse14,169
| 29–39
|-style="background:#cfc
| 69
| March 18
| Washington
| 
| Cody Zeller (19)
| Nicolas Batum (10)
| Kemba Walker (6)
| Spectrum Center19,361
| 30–39
|-style="background:#cfc
| 70
| March 20
| Atlanta
| 
| Batum, Walker (16)
| Marvin Williams (8)
| Nicolas Batum (6)
| Spectrum Center14,278
| 31–39
|-style="background:#cfc
| 71
| March 22
| @ Orlando
| 
| Kemba Walker (22)
| Marvin Williams (10)
| Kemba Walker (7)
| Amway Center16,034
| 32–39
|-style="background:#fcc
| 72
| March 24
| Cleveland
| 
| Kemba Walker (28)
| Williams, Zeller (11)
| Kemba Walker (5)
| Spectrum Center19,511
| 32–40
|-style="background:#cfc
| 73
| March 26
| Phoenix
| 
| Kemba Walker (31)
| Kaminsky, Williams, Zeller (7)
| Nicolas Batum (10)
| Spectrum Center17,292
| 33–40
|-style="background:#fcc
| 74
| March 28
| Milwaukee
| 
| Kemba Walker (28)
| Marvin Williams (7)
| Belinelli, Walker (5)
| Spectrum Center16,505
| 33–41
|-style="background:#cfc
| 75
| March 29
| @ Toronto
| 
| Marco Belinelli (21)
| Marvin Williams (12)
| Marco Belinelli (5)
| Air Canada Centre19,800
| 34–41
|-style="background:#cfc
| 76
| March 31
| Denver
| 
| Kemba Walker (31)
| Cody Zeller (9)
| Nicolas Batum (9)
| Spectrum Center18,353
| 35–41

|- style="background:#cfc
| 77
| April 2
| @ Oklahoma City
| 
| Kemba Walker (29)
| Nicolas Batum (7)
| Nicolas Batum (8)
| Chesapeake Energy Arena18,203
| 36–41
|- style="background:#fcc
| 78
| April 4
| @ Washington
| 
| Kemba Walker (37)
| Cody Zeller (10)
| Nicolas Batum (8)
| Verizon Center18,614
| 36–42
|- style="background:#fcc
| 79
| April 5
| Miami
| 
| Nicolas Batum (24)
| Marvin Williams (12)
| Nicolas Batum (7)
| Spectrum Center17,758
| 36–43
|- style="background:#fcc
| 80
| April 8
| Boston
| 
| Nicolas Batum (31)
| Cody Zeller (9)
| Kemba Walker (8)
| Spectrum Center19,407
| 36–44
|- style="background:#fcc
| 81
| April 10
| @ Milwaukee
| 
| Michael Kidd-Gilchrist (13)
| Miles Plumlee (7)
| Nicolas Batum (8)
| BMO Harris Bradley Center18,717
| 36–45
|- style="background:#fcc
| 82
| April 11
| @ Atlanta
| 
| Jeremy Lamb (21)
| Miles Plumlee (7)
| Nicolas Batum (4)
| Philips Arena14,205
| 36–46

Standings

Transactions

Trades

Free agents

Re-signed

Additions

Subtractions

References

Charlotte Hornets seasons
Charlotte Hornets
Charlotte Hornets
Charlotte Hornets